Gornji Ig (in older sources also Gorenji Ig) is a village in the hills southwest of Iška Vas in the Municipality of Ig in central Slovenia. The entire municipality is part of the traditional region of Inner Carniola and is now included in the Central Slovenia Statistical Region.

Name
The name Gornji Ig literally means 'upper Ig', referring to its location above the Ig area. Gornji Ig was attested in historical sources as Ober Yg in 1300, Ober Ig in 1444, and Oberygdorff in 1493, among other spellings.

Church

The local church, built on a slight elevation north of the settlement, is dedicated to Saint Leonard and belongs to the Parish of Ig. It was a medieval church that was destroyed by Italian artillery on July 16, 1942. The postwar communist authorities prevented it from being rebuilt and it was left in ruins. It was completely reconstructed in its original form and dimensions between 1997 and 1998, in time for the 500th anniversary of its first mention in a written source. The door casing bears the inscription "1498 IHS 1998."

Mass grave

Gornji Ig is the site of a mass grave from the period immediately after the Second World War. It contains the remains of wounded Home Guard soldiers that were murdered in June 1945, as well as 15 to 20 additional civilian victims that had been hiding in Rakitna and were murdered in October 1945.

References

External links

Gornji Ig on Geopedia

Populated places in the Municipality of Ig